Benjamin Sigmund Oehrl (born 21 November 1979) is a German archaeologist and philologist who specializes in Germanic studies.

Biography
Sigmund Oehrl was born in Kassel, Germany on 21 November 1979. He studied prehistory, protohistory, and German and Nordic philology at the University of Göttingen, gaining his master's degree with distinction in 2004. He received his Ph.D. summa cum laude from the University of Göttingen in 2008 with a thesis on runestones in Sweden. 

From 2009 to 2014, Oehrl was a lecturer at the University of Göttingen and a researcher on runic at the Göttingen Academy of Sciences and Humanities. He transferred to the Ludwig Maximilian University of Munich in 2014, where he gained his habilitation on Old Norse philology and prehistoric archaeology in 2016. He has subsequently been a researcher and lecturer at the Ludwig Maximilian University of Munich and Stockholm University.

Oehrl researches a variety of subjects related to Germanic Antiquity, including Germanic religion, Germanic art, runology and petroglyphs. He is particularly known for his research on the picture stones of Gotland. He is a co-editor of Germanische Altertumskunde Online.

See also
 Rudolf Simek
 Wilhelm Heizmann
 Robert Nedoma
 Klaus Düwel
 Arnulf Krause

Selected works

Sources

External links
 Sigmund Oehlr at ResearchGate
 Sigmund Oehlr at Academia.edu

1979 births
German philologists
Germanic studies scholars
Living people
Academic staff of the Ludwig Maximilian University of Munich
Old Norse studies scholars
People from Kassel
Runologists
University of Göttingen alumni
Academic staff of the University of Göttingen
Writers on Germanic paganism